The Embassy of El Salvador in London is the diplomatic mission of El Salvador in the United Kingdom.

Gallery

References

Diplomatic missions in London
Diplomatic missions of El Salvador
El Salvador–United Kingdom relations
Buildings and structures in the City of Westminster
Marylebone